Verbal arithmetic, also known as alphametics,  cryptarithmetic, cryptarithm or word addition, is a type of mathematical game consisting of a mathematical equation among unknown numbers, whose digits are represented by letters of the alphabet.  The goal is to identify the value of each letter.  The name can be extended to puzzles that use non-alphabetic symbols instead of letters.

The equation is typically a basic operation of arithmetic, such as addition, multiplication, or division.  The classic example, published in the July 1924 issue of Strand Magazine by Henry Dudeney, is:

The solution to this puzzle is O = 0, M = 1, Y = 2, E = 5, N = 6, D = 7, R = 8, and S = 9.

Traditionally, each letter should represent a different digit, and (as an ordinary arithmetic notation) the leading digit of a multi-digit number must not be zero.  A good puzzle should have one unique solution, and the letters should make up a phrase (as in the example above).

Verbal arithmetic can be useful as a motivation and source of exercises in the teaching of algebra.

History 
Cryptarithmic puzzles are quite old and their inventor is unknown. An 1864 example in The American Agriculturist disproves the popular notion that it was invented by Sam Loyd.  The name "cryptarithm" was coined by puzzlist Minos (pseudonym of Simon Vatriquant) in the May 1931 issue of Sphinx, a Belgian magazine of recreational mathematics, and was translated as "cryptarithmetic" by Maurice Kraitchik in 1942.  In 1955, J. A. H. Hunter introduced the word "alphametic" to designate cryptarithms, such as Dudeney's, whose letters form meaningful words or phrases.

Types of cryptarithms 

Types of cryptarithm include the alphametic, the digimetic, and the skeletal division.  

Alphametic
 A type of cryptarithm in which a set of words is written down in the form of a long addition sum or some other mathematical problem. The object is to replace the letters of the alphabet with decimal digits to make a valid arithmetic sum.
Digimetic
 A cryptarithm in which digits are used to represent other digits.

Skeletal division
 A long division in which most or all of the digits are replaced by symbols (usually asterisks) to form a cryptarithm.
Reverse cryptarithm
 A rare variation where a formula is written, and the solution is the corresponding cryptarithm whose solution is the formula given.

Solving cryptarithms
Solving a cryptarithm by hand usually involves a mix of deductions and exhaustive tests of possibilities.  For instance the following sequence of deductions solves Dudeney's SEND+MORE = MONEY puzzle above (columns are numbered from right to left):

From column 5, M = 1 since it is the only carry-over possible from the sum of two single digit numbers in column 4.
Since there is a carry in column 5, O must be less than or equal to M (from column 4). But O cannot be equal to M, so O is less than M. Therefore O = 0.
Since O is 1 less than M, S is either 8 or 9 depending on whether there is a carry in column 4. But if there were a carry in column 4, N would be less than or equal to O (from column 3). This is impossible since O = 0. Therefore there is no carry in column 3 and S = 9.
If there were no carry in column 3 then E = N, which is impossible. Therefore there is a carry and N = E + 1.
If there were no carry in column 2, then ( N + R ) mod 10 = E, and N = E + 1, so ( E + 1 + R ) mod 10 = E which means ( 1 + R ) mod 10 = 0, so R = 9. But S = 9, so there must be a carry in column 2 so R = 8.
To produce a carry in column 2, we must have D + E = 10 + Y.
Y is at least 2 so D + E is at least 12.
The only two pairs of available numbers that sum to at least 12 are (5,7) and (6,7) so either E = 7 or D = 7.
Since N = E + 1, E can't be 7 because then N = 8 = R so D = 7.
E can't be 6 because then N = 7 = D so E = 5 and N = 6.
D + E = 12 so Y = 2.
Another example of TO+GO=OUT (source is unknown):

 The sum of two biggest two-digit-numbers is 99+99=198. So O=1 and there is a carry in column 3.
 Since column 1 is on the right of all other columns, it is impossible for it to have a carry. Therefore 1+1=T, and T=2.
 As column 1 had been calculated in the last step, it is known that there isn't a carry in column 2. But, it is also known that there is a carry in column 3 in the first step. Therefore, 2+G≥10. If G is equal to 9, U would equal 1, but this is impossible as O also equals 1. So only G=8 is possible and with 2+8=10+U, U=0.

The use of modular arithmetic often helps.  For example, use of mod-10 arithmetic allows the columns of an addition problem to be treated as simultaneous equations, while the use of mod-2 arithmetic allows inferences based on the parity of the variables.

In computer science, cryptarithms provide good examples to illustrate the brute force method, and algorithms that  generate all permutations of m choices from n possibilities. For example, the Dudeney puzzle above can be solved by testing all assignments of eight values among the digits 0 to 9 to the eight letters S,E,N,D,M,O,R,Y, giving 1,814,400 possibilities. They also provide good examples for backtracking paradigm of algorithm design.

Other information
When generalized to arbitrary bases, the problem of determining if a cryptarithm has a solution is NP-complete. (The generalization is necessary for the hardness result because in base 10, there are only 10! possible assignments of digits to letters, and these can be checked against the puzzle in linear time.)

Alphametics can be combined with other number puzzles such as Sudoku and Kakuro to create cryptic Sudoku and Kakuro.

Longest alphametics 
Anton Pavlis constructed an alphametic in 1983 with 41 addends:

SO+MANY+MORE+MEN+SEEM+TO+SAY+THAT+
THEY+MAY+SOON+TRY+TO+STAY+AT+HOME+
SO+AS+TO+SEE+OR+HEAR+THE+SAME+ONE+
MAN+TRY+TO+MEET+THE+TEAM+ON+THE+
MOON+AS+HE+HAS+AT+THE+OTHER+TEN
=TESTS

(The answer is that MANYOTHERS=2764195083.)

See also
 Diophantine equation
 Mathematical puzzles
 Permutation
 Puzzles
 Sideways Arithmetic From Wayside School - A book whose plot revolves around these puzzles
 Cryptogram

References

 Martin Gardner, Mathematics, Magic, and Mystery. Dover (1956)
 Journal of Recreational Mathematics, had a regular alphametics column.
 Jack van der Elsen, Alphametics. Maastricht (1998)
 Kahan S., Have some sums to solve: The complete alphametics book, Baywood Publishing, (1978)
 Brooke M. One Hundred & Fifty Puzzles in Crypt-Arithmetic. New York: Dover, (1963)
 Hitesh Tikamchand Jain, ABC of Cryptarithmetic/Alphametics. India(2017)

External links
Solution using Matlab code and tutorial
 Cryptarithms at cut-the-knot
 
 
 Alphametics and Cryptarithms

Alphametics solvers 

Alphametics Solver!
Alphametics Puzzle Solver
Android app to solve Crypt Arithmatic problems
Alphametic Solver written in Python
An online tool to create and solve Alphametics and Cryptarithms
An online tool to solve, create, store and retrieve alphametics - over 4000 English alphametics available with solutions

Logic puzzles